John Hardy Doyle (April 23, 1844 – March 24, 1919) was a Republican politician in the U.S. State of Ohio who was an Ohio Supreme Court Judge during 1883.

Biography

John Doyle was born in Perry County, Ohio, and lived in Toledo, Ohio from 1847 until his death. He was educated in the Toledo Public Schools and for a short time at Denison University of Granville. During the winter of 1862-1863, he intended to enter the 67th Ohio Infantry, but was stricken with typhoid fever, and unable to pursue military service. He began study of law with Henry S. Commager, and continued with Edward Bissel. He was admitted to the bar on his 21st birthday, and entered partnership with Bissel.

In 1879, Doyle was elected, as a Republican, judge of the Common Pleas Court for the district of Lucas, Sandusky, Ottawa, Huron and Erie Counties. In 1882, he was nominated for the Ohio Supreme Court by the Republicans, but lost to Democrat John W. Okey that autumn.

In February, 1883, Governor Foster appointed Doyle to fill the vacancy on the Supreme Court caused by the resignation of Nicholas Longworth II. He was nominated again that year, but lost to Democrat Selwyn N. Owen, and resigned his seat in December 1883.

Doyle returned to private practice in Toledo. Presidents William Howard Taft and William McKinley each offered him the position Judge of the United States District Court for the Northern District of Ohio, which he twice declined. He was president of the American Bar Association 1889-1890, and president of the Ohio Bar Association, 1893. He also lectured on constitutional law at St. John's Law School at Toledo.

Doyle was married October 6, 1868 to Alice Fuller Skinner from Windsor, Connecticut, a descendant of Roger Wolcott and Oliver Wolcott, and had three daughters. Doyle died March 24, 1919. He died in Florida. He is interred in Woodlawn Cemetery (Toledo, Ohio).

Publications

See also
List of justices of the Ohio Supreme Court

Notes

References

Ohio lawyers
Justices of the Ohio Supreme Court
Ohio Republicans
Politicians from Toledo, Ohio
1844 births
1919 deaths
Denison University alumni
Presidents of the American Bar Association
Lawyers from Toledo, Ohio
19th-century American judges
19th-century American lawyers